Shade, the Changing Man is a comic book character created by Steve Ditko for DC Comics in 1977. The character was later adapted by Peter Milligan and Chris Bachalo in one of the first Vertigo titles.

Both versions of Shade are distinct from the Shade, another DC Comics character.

Publishing history
Shade, the Changing Man told the story of a fugitive from the militant planet Meta in another dimension. Shade (whose full name is Rac Shade) was powered by a stolen "M-vest" (or Miraco-Vest, named for its inventor) which protected him with a force field and enabled him to project the illusion of becoming a large grotesque version of himself.

The character was the first Ditko had created, or helped to create, for a mainstream publisher for many years. Prior to rejoining DC Comics, Ditko had worked on characters such as his Mr. A. title. Shade was very much a return to mainstream superheroics, although Shade indicated no particular connection with the DC Universe (although the letters columns stated that there is no reason it could not be shown to be there).  Michael Fleisher scripted the series based on Ditko's plotting and art.

His series ran for eight bi-monthly issues in 1978 before its sudden cancellation in the wake of the "DC Implosion", a contraction of DC's line that saw a third of their books axed right before the September releases. A ninth extra-length issue, featuring the debut of a new Ditko character called the Odd Man, was produced, but was published only as a part of DC's Cancelled Comic Cavalcade in 1978. A revised version of the Odd Man story appeared in Detective Comics #487 (Dec. 1979-Jan. 1980). Both stories were published in The Steve Ditko Omnibus Vol. 1 (2011), a hardcover collection of Ditko's DC work.

After this, Shade was adopted into the DC Universe and made a brief appearance in the Crisis on Infinite Earths miniseries as well as becoming a regular character in Suicide Squad.

Fictional character biography

Original series

Rac Shade, a secret agent of the world in the Meta-Zone, a dimension near that of Earth, between which is the Zero-Zone, has been framed for treason and sentenced to death. Through various events, Shade spent some time on Earth trying to clear his name, using the retrieved M-Vest (the Miraco-Vest that had been stolen) in the process, but was met with resistance of the Meta-authorities at each point. His name was being cleared bit by bit, but he remained a wanted man, and Shade continued to use the M-Vest. Shade's former fiancée, Mellu Loron, wanted to kill him for some time for causing an explosion that crippled her parents. Her mother, operating a mechanical monster called the Supreme Decider (or Sude) had other plans.

The Metans have an outpost on Earth which is called the Occult Research Center (O.R.C).  The center was run by Wizor, assisted by Leno. Mellu ran it for a time. The O.R.C. operates by telling the absolute truth about Meta, something the public tends to laugh off. When Mellu desires to kill Shade, the fact that other, more violent, criminals released in the freak accident during the prison riot that freed Shade become priority, annoys her greatly and causes her to leave the organization.

When Dr. Sagan shows Mellu videotape evidence that Shade has rescued her from a deadly part of the Zero-Zone called the Area of Madness (from which no one but Shade, thanks to the vest, has exited without expending all their bodily resources screaming), she changes her mind about Shade, in spite of having been the one who had ultimately captured him.

In the final issue, President Olon's hands are tied in regard to the treason charge. Even though he considers Shade innocent, until his death sentence is overturned in court, he is still under a death sentence as Col. Kross gathers evidence in his defense. With all of these on his side, he (Shade) leaps into the Zero-Zone and is swallowed by the Area of Madness.

Running with the Suicide Squad
Shade ends up living in the Area of Madness. The Suicide Squad, after leaving Nightshade's home dimension, ends up here and Shade is able to adjust his M-Vest so he can teleport himself and the Squad to Earth.

The O.R.C has been taken over by Doctor Z.Z. and a gang of Metan criminals. They hope to use the place as a base to conquer Earth and eventually Meta itself. Shade's plan to stop them is sidetracked by the Crisis On Infinite Earths and being stuck back in the Zero Zone. He is eventually rescued by the Squad.

Shade's second attempt at stopping Z.Z. is successful, though Metan authorities still wish to arrest him. Rick Flag pulls a gun and Shade is allowed to leave with the Squad.

Shade is offered technical help in returning to Meta in exchange for his help on missions. Shade cooperates, though he is not quite sure if Earth's technology is up to the task. Shade also spends time trying to help the ex-Squad member Mindboggler, who had died in issue #2, then became Ifrit, a digitized ally of the Onslaught.

Shade became increasingly doubtful of the wisdom of staying with the Squad. So when Lashina (in the disguise of Duchess) came to him with an offer to return him to his home dimension via a detour to Apokolips, Shade agrees, not knowing what was in store for him. He ends up being forced to kidnap Vixen as well as Captain Boomerang (although he had little regret over kidnapping the latter). Shade knew that his actions were wrong, but felt he had little choice.

Lashina betrayed him as soon as possible on Apokolips. Several of Shade's friends, the pilot Briscoe, civilian Flo Crowley (part of the Task Force X support staff) and the villain Dr. Light soon die in the fight against Parademons and the Female Furies. Darkseid appears and settles the conflict, sending the Squad and its dead home. Shade, wracked with guilt, is sent back to his home dimension.

His whereabouts since then have been unknown.

Peter Milligan and the Vertigo years

In July 1990, just six months after Shade's final appearance in Suicide Squad, Shade was revamped by Peter Milligan and Chris Bachalo, becoming part of the so-called "British Invasion", alongside Neil Gaiman's Sandman and Grant Morrison's Animal Man.

The new series still took place in the DC Universe: John Constantine turned up for a three-issue story arc, Death of the Endless appeared in a subtle cameo in issue #50 and Shade appeared with a group of other Vertigo characters in 1999's one-shot Totems.
The comic departed quickly from its origins. Milligan and Bachalo reinvented Rac Shade as a red-headed lovelorn poet sent to Earth to stop a growing tide of madness from consuming the planet, his M-Vest becoming a Madness-Vest capable of warping reality. Working from Brendan McCarthy's character designs, Bachalo created a distinctive look for the comic, distinguishing it from the character's other DC Universe appearances. The original series was retconned as a story that Shade made up to amuse himself while traveling to Earth (left unexplained was his stint with the Suicide Squad).

Milligan killed Shade off several times during the series, bringing him back each time in a different form: a woman; a black-haired madman; a red-haired, emotionless mod; and a bedraggled, unshaven obsessive.

The series employed concepts and ideas which were at times controversial and distinct from regular DC titles (for example, JFK's assassination and transgenderism). To distinguish these more 'adult' themes in Shade and other titles, DC created the Vertigo imprint in 1993. Shade became one of the initial Vertigo titles starting with issue #33.

Shade sold steadily for Vertigo and maintained a cult following. The title lasted 70 issues before being cancelled in 1996.

In 2003, a special one-off story by Peter Milligan and artist Mike Allred was printed as part of Vertigo's 10th anniversary celebration.

In 2004, the first six issues of Shade were reprinted as a Vertigo trade paperback.

In August 2010, Hellblazer #268 featured the return of Shade, the Changing Man, this time as a supporting cast member for John Constantine in a series of storylines written by Milligan.

According to the Absolute Crisis on Infinite Earths hardcover book, the events of the second series originally took place on Earth-85 in the DC Multiverse before its destruction.

Return to the DCU
In 2011, Shade was featured in Geoff Johns' Flashpoint miniseries and its spin-off miniseries Flashpoint: Secret Seven (written by Peter Milligan) as the leader of the Secret Seven. After Flashpoint as part of The New 52 (a reboot of the DC Comics universe), Shade appears as one of the lead characters in the first story arc of Justice League Dark, a new title written by Peter Milligan and drawn by Mikel Janin.

Other versions

Kingdom Come
In Kingdom Come, Alex Ross created Shade III, a black adaptation. He is referred to as "more of the classic, heroic version", and is visually based more on the Steve Ditko Shade than the Peter Milligan Shade.

JLA: The Nail
Another Elseworlds version of the classic Shade appeared in JLA: The Nail as a member of the Outsiders.

Flashpoint

In 2011, Shade returned to the DC Universe in Flashpoint: Secret Seven, a limited series spin-off of the Flashpoint crossover event. The series is written by Peter Milligan and drawn by George Pérez. This version of Shade is visually based on the Vertigo incarnation, but draws elements from the original Steve Ditko iteration of the character as well. In the series, history is altered accidentally by the Flash, resulting in a greatly altered timeline that reimagines many characters. Here, Shade is the leader of a band of heroes dubbed the Secret Seven, which includes the Enchantress and Amethyst, Princess of Gemworld. Shade and the others are recruited by Cyborg as part of an effort to stop an apocalyptic war between Atlantis and New Themyscira.

DC's Young Animal

In October 2016, DC debuted a new imprint: Young Animal. One of the initial titles is Shade, The Changing Girl, which features a female Metan named Loma who admires the late Rac Shade and his poetry. She steals the Madness Vest from a museum and takes over the body of a comatose teenage girl called Megan Boyer on Earth. The creative team behind this new version includes writer Cecil Castellucci and artist Marley Zarcone. Beginning in March 2018, the series changed names like many Young Animal titles. It is currently called Shade, The Changing Woman.
"Shade, the Changing Girl" ended its run during the events of "Milk Wars" and began again as "Shade, The Changing Woman" which went for six issues, ending in July. After the name change, the tone of the book changed to a more introspective one, as Loma left her small town and traveled through several locations, while the book also shifted its focus onto the secondary characters introduced on the previous run. Exploring themes of dissociation, depression, xenophobia, destiny and being an outcast, Loma eventually meets Rac Shade and the story comes full circle to connect with the previous Vertigo incarnation.

Both titles also featured Loma's successor River Johnson. He was a normal teenage outcast in the small suburban town that Loma Shade was transported to after stealing the M-Vest. River, finding out that Loma was an alien in disguise, became her first friend on Earth and her confidant. Like Loma, River is also bisexual, and the first black person to use the alias Shade, the Changing Man, after being given the M-Vest.

Collected editions
The original Steve Ditko series is collected in The Steve Ditko Omnibus Vol. 1 (2011).

The Vertigo series is being collected into trade paperbacks:

Volume 1: The American Scream (168 pages, collects #1-6, 2003, Titan Books, DC Comics, DC version resolicited 2009, reprint, Titan, December 2009)
Volume 2: The Edge of Vision (192 pages, collects #7-13, DC Comics, November 2009, Titan Books, January 2010)
Volume 3: Scream Time (176 pages, collects #14-19, DC Comics, July 2010)

The Young Animal series is collected into three trade paperbacks:

Shade, the Changing Girl Volume 1: Earth Girl Made Easy (144 pages, collects #1-6, DC Comics, 2017, DC Comics)
Shade, the Changing Girl Volume 2: Little Runaway (168 pages, collects #7-12, DC Comics, 2018)
Shade, the Changing Woman (168 pages, collects #1-6, DC Comics, 2019)

In other media

Television
 Shade, the Changing Man appears in one of the DC Nation Shorts on Cartoon Network, voiced by Benjamin Diskin.

Film
 Shade appeared in Justice League: The Flashpoint Paradox.

References

External links
Shade, the Changing Man at Don Markstein's Toonopedia. Archived from the original on May 19, 2017.
 Pete Milligan interview

African-American superheroes
DC Comics superheroes
DC Comics male superheroes
Fictional secret agents and spies
DC Comics aliens
DC Comics LGBT superheroes
Comics by Michael Fleisher
Comics by Steve Ditko
DC Comics fantasy characters
Fictional bisexual males
Fictional bisexual females
Fictional characters who can manipulate reality
Fictional poets
Fictional people from Liverpool
Fictional people from London
1977 comics debuts
Comics characters introduced in 1977
Comics characters introduced in 1990
Characters created by Steve Ditko
DC Comics titles